The Battle of Ros Mhic Thriúin took place in 1394 near New Ross, County Wexford, Ireland. It pitted the Norman Lordship of Ireland against the Kingdom of Leinster.  The forces of Leinster were led by King Art Mór Mac Murchadha Caomhánach (also known as Art Mac Murrough), and they were victorious.

References

Conflicts in 1394
Battles involving the Laigin
Battles involving England
1394 in Ireland
Battles of the Middle Ages
History of County Wexford
MacMorrough Kavanagh dynasty